Dipterocarpus verrucosus is a species of tree in the family Dipterocarpaceae. It is native to Borneo, Peninsular Malaysia and Thailand. The species locally common on ridges in mixed dipterocarp forest. Its keruing timber is exploited by logging, particularly in Borneo.

References

verrucosus
Flora of Borneo
Flora of Peninsular Malaysia
Flora of Thailand